The Character of Rain is a 2000 short novel by the Belgian author Amélie Nothomb originally written in French. The English translated edition of the novel was published by Faber and Faber.

Plot
The novel, apparently autobiographical, describes the world as discovered and seen by a three-year-old child born in Japan to a Belgian family. It encompasses the themes of self-awareness, language acquisition, bilingualism, and developmental psychology.

The Japanese believe that until the age of three, children, whether Japanese or not, are gods, each one an okosama, or "lord child." On their third birthday, they fall from grace and join the rest of the human race.  The narrator of the novel has spent the first two and a half years of her life in a nearly vegetative state until she is jolted out of her plant-like, tube-like state, and gains a peculiar but complete awareness of the world around her. Her parents see how their 'plant' becomes a child and discover that she can move. Their enthusiasm does not last long though, because their daughter is now very active. She screams all day and gets tantrums as if she must catch up on the time she lost as a 'plant'. Only when she discovers the existence of pleasure by eating white chocolate she comes to a quiet. Most fascinating to the narrator is the discovery of water in oceans, seas, pools, puddles, streams, ponds, and, rain - one meaning of the Japanese character for her name and a symbol of her amphibious life. However, she also discovers the language, Japanese, the pond with carp, time, and death. This discovery despairs her to the point of attempting suicide, but she is rescued from drowning in the pond with the carp.

References 

2000 Belgian novels
Novels by Amélie Nothomb
Novels set in Japan
Faber and Faber books
Japan in non-Japanese culture
Éditions Albin Michel books